The 2017 Case Western Reserve Spartans football team represented Case Western Reserve University as a member of the Presidents' Athletic Conference (PAC) during the 2017 NCAA Division III football season. The team was coached by 14th-year head coach Greg Debeljak and played its home games at DiSanto Field in Cleveland. The Spartans won both the PAC at 8–0 and the University Athletic Association (UAA) at 2–0, finishing the regular season an undefeated 10–0.

In second round, Case Western Reserve was defeated by the eventual national champion, Mount Union.

Schedule

References

Case Western Reserve
Case Western Reserve Spartans football seasons
Case Western Reserve Spartans football